

Background
He was born in 1904, the second son of Thomas Farrer, 2nd Baron Farrer, and the first by his second wife Evangeline (née Knox), daughter of Octavius Newry Knox JP (son of The Hon. John Henry Knox, son of Thomas Knox, 1st Earl of Ranfurly).

Life
He was educated at Westminster School and Trinity College, Cambridge (BA 1925). During the Second World War he served as an officer in the Royal Air Force, reaching the rank of wing commander. He was a county councillor on Hertfordshire County Council and was appointed to be a Deputy Lieutenant of Hertfordshire in 1951 and a justice of the peace. In 1948 Farrer succeeded his half-brother in the title; upon his own death in 1954, the Barony passed to their cousin, Anthony Farrer, 5th Baron Farrer, before becoming extinct.

Marriage
In 1931 he married Katharine Runciman, youngest daughter of Walter Runciman, 1st Viscount Runciman of Doxford. They had no children.

References 

 'FARRER', Who Was Who, A & C Black, 1920–2008; online edn, Oxford University Press, Dec 2007 accessed 20 May 2011

Barons in the Peerage of the United Kingdom
1904 births
1954 deaths
People educated at Westminster School, London
Alumni of Trinity College, Cambridge
Members of Hertfordshire County Council
Royal Air Force personnel of World War II
Deputy Lieutenants of Hertfordshire